Malcolm & Eddie is  an American sitcom that premiered August 26, 1996, on UPN, and ran for four seasons, airing its final episode on May 22, 2000.  This series starred Malcolm-Jamal Warner and Eddie Griffin in the lead roles. The program was produced by Jeff Franklin Productions in association with TriStar Television in its first three seasons and by Columbia TriStar Television in its final season.

Synopsis
Malcolm McGee (Malcolm-Jamal Warner) is a responsible and sensible twenty something who ends up sharing an apartment and a business venture with relentlessly enthusiastic tow truck owner Eddie Sherman (Eddie Griffin) in Kansas City, Missouri (which is Eddie Griffin's hometown). A fast talker with outlandish frenetic energy, Eddie's charming naiveté always seems to get the two into hot water. But no matter what the situation, these opposites always end up bailing each other out.

When the guys unexpectedly became recipients of a considerable sum of money, Malcolm and Eddie decided to buy not only the old Irish pub below their apartment, but the entire building, including Eddie's garage, as an investment. As new bar owners, the guys gave the place a face lift by turning it into a sports bar and renaming it McGee's. There, they hang out with local regulars, including Tim (Jaime Cardriche), a gentle giant working as a nurse, and Nicolette (Karen Malina White), the motor-mouth police academy cadet with a love-crazed obsession for Eddie. As Malcolm manages McGee's and Eddie tries to bolster his fledgling one-man/one-truck towing operation into a fleet, success for these two could be as simple as staying out of trouble.

Cast
Malcolm-Jamal Warner as Malcolm McGee
Eddie Griffin as Eddie Sherman
Miriam Flynn – Kelly (1996)
Karen Malina White as Nicolette Vandross
Jaime Cardriche as Tim (1996–1998)
Christopher Daniel Barnes as Leonard Rickets (1998–2000)

Supporting cast
Karyn Bryant as Antoinette Chapman
Enya Flack as Bridget Goodwin
Angelle Brooks as Holly Brooks (1996–1997)
Ron Pearson as Doug Rickets (1998–2000)
Tommy Davidson as Dexter Sherman (1999–2000)
Michelle Hurd as Simone (1997–1998)
Kina Lane as McGee's Patron
Freez Luv as Hector

Regular guests
Tucker Smallwood as Theodore Roosevelt Hawkins (7 episodes)
Alexia Robinson as Ashley Hawkins (5 episodes)
Andray Johnson as Irate Audience Member (4 episodes)
Kellita Smith as Danielle (4 episodes)
Dawn McMillan as Mia (4 episodes)
JoNell Kennedy as Maura McGee (3 episodes)
Erik Palladino as Jason (1997–1998)
Chene Lawson as Leslie Sherman (2 episodes)
Charlie Robinson as Marcus McGee (2 episodes)

Episodes

Season 1 (1996–97)

Season 2 (1997–98)

Season 3 (1998–99)

Season 4 (1999–2000)

U.S. television ratings

Awards and nominations

Home release 
On April 21, 2009, Shout! Factory released the first season of Malcolm & Eddie on DVD in Region 1.

Syndication
Repeats of Malcolm & Eddie aired in local syndication in the early 2000s, and on cable's BET in early-mid 2008; recently, it has begun to air on BET's derivative network, Centric. In the UK, it aired on the British Channel, Trouble & on MTV2 on July 1, 2011.  It is also airing on Australia's 7mate.  The series has also aired on FamilyNet on September 1, 2014.
Since February 2017, Fuse is currently airing reruns of the show. As of 2018, repeats of the sitcom are being aired. As of 2019, selected seasons are available to view for free on Crackle with the season selection changing by yearly quarters. In 2019, Malcolm & Eddie began airing on StarzEncore and all episodes are available on demand via multiple streaming and cable platforms.

References

External links

1990s American black sitcoms
1990s American sitcoms
1996 American television series debuts
2000s American black sitcoms
2000s American sitcoms
2000 American television series endings
English-language television shows
Television duos
Television series by Sony Pictures Television
Television shows set in Kansas City, Missouri
UPN original programming